The Stoned Immaculate is the sixth studio album by American hip hop recording artist Curren$y. It was released through Warner Bros. Records on June 5, 2012. This release was his first "major" release through Warner Bros. The album features guest appearances from Pharrell, Wiz Khalifa, Estelle, 2 Chainz, Wale, Marsha Ambrosius, Daz Dillinger, Big K.R.I.T., Fiend, Corner Boy P, Young Roddy, Trademark da Skydiver, and Smoke DZA.

Background 
Currensy officially announced the release of The Stoned Immaculate, this second release on Warner Bros. Records, on November 11, 2011. It was first set to be released in March/April 2012 but was pushed back to May 22 and finally to June 5. On March 10, 2012, Currensy announced he officially completed the album.

Currensy explained during an interview with HipHopDX that The Stoned Immaculate was more complicated to record than his previous albums, and noted that he had finished off past projects in only a few days: "Just from working with more people. I did more traveling than I usually do when I’m working on a project. I did Weekend at Burnie's in Miami with Monsta Beatz in two days. With this one I moved around. I was in L.A. with Daz, in Miami with Pharrell, and I recorded some of the records in New York and shit. That’s really the only difference, the music and my mindset is still the same," The album featured West Coast artist and producer, Daz Dillinger, which Currensy explained "I tried to find Daz a few times on Twitter but that didn’t really work out. One time in a meeting with Warner [Bros. Records] I brought up his name and asked them to try find Daz for me. A couple days after the meeting I got his e-mail and we smoked, burned it down, made sure everything was cool and did some work."

The title of the album is reference to lyrics from the song "The WASP (Texas Radio and the Big Beat)" by American rock band The Doors, off of their 1971 album release L.A. Woman. In the track, lead singer Jim Morrison sings "Out here on the perimeter there are no stars/Out here we is stoned – immaculate."

Promotion 
On February 5, 2012, Currensy released a 5-track Mixtape titled "Here". On February 28, 2012, Currensy released a 5-track joint-EP with Styles P. titled "#The1st28". On March 20, 2012, Currensy previewed 3 new tracks, "Sunroof", "Stainless", and "No Squares", live on Shade 45. On April 10, 2012, Currensy went on Toca Tuesdays to freestyle and promote the album. The Album became available to pre-order on April 20, 2012, on Currensy's official website.

Also, Currensy is holding an alternate Cover Contest and Tour Video Footage Contest on his official site with different available prizes. On May 17, Curren$y leaked the song "Capitol" (featuring 2 Chainz) with production from The Innovatorz via Stereogum.com. On May 31, the song "Chasin' Paper" (featuring Pharrell) was leaked via KanyeToThe.com. On May 31, Curren$y held an exclusive album live stream of his Webster Hall performance via YouTube, as he wraps up his 47-city long "Jet Life" tour.

Singles 
The first single, "What It Look Like" (featuring Wale) was leaked on the internet on April 3, 2012, and released to digital retailers on April 10, 2012. The music video was released on April 7, 2012. The song, "Fast Cars, Faster Women" (featuring Daz), was released along with a pre-order of the album on Curren$y's official website on 4/20, which served as a street single for the album. The official second single "Jet Life" (featuring Wiz Khalifa & Big K.R.I.T.) with production by Big K.R.I.T. was released via YouTube May 28, 2012. A Remix to "Jet Life" called "Dont Miss This Jet" featuring Young Jeezy and Lil Wayne was released on July 3, 2012.

Music videos 
On April 8. 2012, the music video was released for "What It Look Like" featuring  Wale. On May 10, 2012, the music video was released for "Fast Cars Faster Women" featuring Daz Dillinger. On June 5, 2012, the music video was released for "Capitol" featuring 2 Chainz. On July 4, 2012, the music video was released for "Showroom". On September 18, 2012, the music video was released for "Jet Life" featuring Wiz Khalifa and Big K.R.I.T. On November 11, 2012, the music video was released for "Chandelier". On June 3, 2013, the music video was released for "Sunroof" featuring Corner Boy P.

Reception 
The Stoned Immaculate received generally favorable reviews from contemporary music critics. At Metacritic, which assigns a normalized rating out of 100 to reviews from mainstream critics, the album received an average score of 73, based on 16 reviews.

Commercial performance 
The Stoned Immaculate is Currensy's highest charting album to date debuting at number 8 on the U.S. Billboard 200 chart with first week sales of 36,100 copies. The album also debuted at number 2 on the Top R&B/Hip-Hop Albums as well as the Top Rap Albums. As of November 2015, the album has sold 93,000 units.

Track listing 

Sample credits
 "No Squares" features excerpts from the Gerard Marino recording "Death Of Kratos".
 "Sunroof" features an interpolation of "Na Boca Do Sol" (A. Verocai, V. Martins).
 "Chasin' Paper" contains an interpolation of "Ooh Child" by Five Stairsteps, written by Stan Vincent.
 "Audio Dope III" features excerpts from the Giorgos Hatzinassios recording "Pursuit."
 "One More Time" features excerpts from the Deniece Williams recording "Why Can’t We Fall In Love."
 "J.L.R." contains excerpts from "Love Theme" written by Kazuya Senke and Yuji Ohno.
 "Off Dat" features an interpolation of "If You Didn’t Love Me (Don’t Go Away)" (D.W. Julius Rogers)

Release history

Charts

Weekly charts

Year-end charts

References 

2012 albums
Currensy albums
Albums produced by Daz Dillinger
Albums produced by J.U.S.T.I.C.E. League
Albums produced by Pharrell Williams
Albums produced by Bink (record producer)
Warner Records albums
Albums produced by Big K.R.I.T.
Albums produced by Cardo